Goudriaan is a village in the Dutch province of South Holland. It is a part of the municipality of Molenlanden, and lies about 25 km east of Rotterdam.

On 1 January 2006, the village of Goudriaan had 843 inhabitants. The built-up area of the village was 0.028 km², and contained 309 residences.

Goudriaan was a separate municipality until 1986, when it became part of Graafstroom. Last one has become a part of Molenwaard in 2013.

References

Former municipalities of South Holland
Populated places in South Holland
Molenlanden